are a type of traditional Japanese clothing.

There are two types of : divided  and undivided . The  type have divided legs, similar to trousers. Both of these types appear similar. They are looser in the waist and narrower in the leg.

 are secured by four straps: two longer   attached on either side of the front of the garment, and two shorter  attached on either side of the rear.

, especially those for martial arts, may have seven deep pleats, two on the back and five on the front. Although they appear balanced, the arrangement of the front pleats (three to the right, two to the left) is asymmetrical, and as such is an example of asymmetry in Japanese aesthetics.

Men's 
While  used to be a required part of menswear, nowadays typical Japanese men usually wear  only on extremely formal occasions and at tea ceremonies, weddings, and funerals.  are also regularly worn by practitioners of a variety of martial arts, such as kendo, iaido, taidō, aikido, jōdō, ryū-te, and kyūdō. Sumo wrestlers, who do not wear  in the context of their sport, are, however, required to wear traditional Japanese dress whenever they appear in public. As  are one of the most important parts of traditional male formal dress, sumo wrestlers are often seen wearing  when attending appropriately formal functions.

In addition to martial artists,  are also part of the everyday wear of Shinto , priests who maintain and perform services at shrines.

 are worn with any type of kimono except  (light cotton summer kimono generally worn for relaxing, for sleeping or at festivals or summer outings). While glossy black-and-white striped  are usually worn with formal kimono, stripes in colours other than black, grey and white are worn with less formal wear. Solid and graduated (ombré) colours are also common.

These are worn with black  kimono (kimono with one, three, or five family crests on the back, chest, and shoulders), white  (divided-toe socks), white  (under-kimono) and various types of footwear.

Traditionally made of silk,  are sometimes made with blends.  is woven with a dense warp. Traditionally, the weft is woven wet, and beaten firmly into place to make it denser. The silk strands are not twisted, and are treated in lye. These techniques makes the cloth glossy and the pattern very small-scale and precise.

The  are red under-pants, with closed crotch, tied off on the wearer's left. These  designs can be traced to the Nara period.

and 

These resemble normal  in every way except their remarkable length in both the back and front, forming a train one or two feet long and impeding the ability to walk normally, thus helping to prevent a surprise attack or assassination attempt.  are now only worn particularly in Noh plays (including ), kabuki plays, and Shinto rituals.

Some  during the Sengoku period had the hems made narrower than the body in imitation of the ballooning trousers worn by the Portuguese. This style carried on into the Edo period and became called . In addition to the taper, they had a secured band of cloth—looking rather like a pants cuff—sewn around each leg's hem, so the ballooning fabric would not open out like regular .

, also called , are a type of  that are meant to be worn blousing over the leg and exposing the foot. To accomplish this, they are somewhat longer than normal , and a cord is run through the hem and drawn tight, creating a "ballooning" effect. To allow for the body required, more formal  featured six panels rather than four. These cords were pulled tight and tied off at the ankle. This was the form commonly worn during the Heian period.  were worn by court nobles with various types of leisure or semi-formal wear.

They were worn by samurai warriors.

Women's 

Women's  differ from men's in a variety of ways, most notably fabric design and method of tying.

While men's  can be worn on both formal and informal occasions, women rarely wear , except at graduation ceremonies and for traditional Japanese sports such as kyūdō, some branches of aikido and kendo. Women do not wear  at tea ceremony.

A 's uniform consists of a plain white kimono with a bright red , sometimes a red  during formal ceremonies.

While formal men's  are made of striped fabric, women's formal  are either a solid color or dyed with graduating hues.  for young women are sometimes sparsely decorated with embroidered flowers such as cherry blossoms. Women typically wear  just below the bust line, while men wear them at the waist.

Dress reform and scholastic use
 have traditionally been worn as school wear. Before the advent of school uniforms in Japan, students wore everyday clothes, which included  for men. In the Meiji period (1868–1912) and Taishō period (1912–1926), Western-style wear was adopted for school uniforms, initially for both male and female uniforms. However, at the time, Western women's dress was fairly cumbersome.

Utako Shimoda (1854–1936), a women's activist, educator and dress reformer, found traditional kimono to be too restrictive, preventing women and girls from moving and taking part in physical activities, harming their health. While Western dress was being adopted at the time, she also believed corsets to be restrictive and harmful to women's health. Shimoda had worked as a lady-in-waiting to Empress Shōken from 1871-1879. She adapted the clothing worn by ladies-in-waiting at the Japanese imperial court to make a uniform for her Jissen Women's School. It became standard wear for high schools in Japan, and is still worn for graduation ceremonies.

Tying 

There are many ways for men to tie . The most formal method results in a knot that resembles two bow-ties in a cross shape.

The method of tying the ties is also different, with women's  being tied in a simpler knot or a bow. As with men's , the front ties are first brought to the back, then to the front, then tied at the back in a knot. Then the back  are brought around to the front. At this point, they may be tied with a bow at the left hip, just in front of the opening, with the ends of the ties at equal lengths. For more secure fastening, the ties may be wrapped once at center front, then tied inside at the back.

Folding 

Like all types of traditional Japanese clothing, it is important to fold and store  correctly to prevent damage and prolong the life of the garment, especially those made of silk. With  this is particularly important, since  have so many pleats which can easily lose their creases; re-creasing the pleats may require specialist attention in extreme cases.

 are often considered particularly challenging to learn to fold properly, in part because of their pleats and in part because their long ties must be correctly smoothed and gathered before being tied in specific patterns.

This is often considered an important part of etiquette.

In some martial arts it is also an old tradition that the highest ranking student has the responsibility to fold the teacher's  as a token of respect.

See also
 Harem pants
 Bloomers

References

Further reading
 How to fold the Hakama, Southern California Naginata Federation.
 How to tie a Hakama, Bu Jin Design Corporation.
 How to wash a Hakama, Kendo America.

External links

Japanese lower-body garments
Keikogi
Shinto religious clothing
Skirts
History of Asian clothing
Samurai clothing
Articles containing video clips
Japanese words and phrases